The UAE 2000 Guineas, is a horse race run over a distance of 1,600 metres (one mile) on dirt in February at Meydan Racecourse in Dubai. The race is restricted to three-year-olds.

It was first contested in 2000 on dirt at Nad Al Sheba Racecourse. It was transferred to Meydan in 2010 where it was run on the synthetic Tapeta Footings surface. In 2015 the synthetic surface at Meydan was replaced by a dirt track.

The UAE 2000 Guineas began as an ungraded race before being promoted to Group 3 level in 2002.

Records
Record time:
1:34.80 - Bachir 2000, Honour Devil 2008

Most wins by a jockey:
 3 - Frankie Dettori 2001, 2002, 2009
 3 - Mickael Barzalona 2011, 2012, 2014

Most wins by a trainer:
 7 - Saeed bin Suroor 2000, 2001, 2002, 2009, 2015, 2017, 2019

Most wins by an owner:
 8 - Godolphin Racing 2000, 2001, 2002, 2004, 2009, 2012, 2014, 2015, 2017, 2019

Winners

See also
 List of United Arab Emirates horse races

References

Racing Post:
 , 

Horse races in the United Arab Emirates
Recurring sporting events established in 2000
Nad Al Sheba Racecourse
2000 establishments in the United Arab Emirates